Dermatocarpon meiophyllizum is a species of lichen belonging to the family Verrucariaceae.

References

Further reading

Verrucariales 
Lichen species
Lichens described in 1921